Spring Turns to Spring is a 2019 South Korean television series starring Lee Yu-ri, Uhm Ji-won, Lee Jong-hyuk, and Choi Byung-mo. It aired from January 23 to March 21, 2019 on MBC's Wednesdays and Thursdays at 22:00 KST time slot.

Synopsis
The story of two women whose souls switch bodies, giving them chance to live out their dreams and gain new experiences.

Cast

Main
 Lee Yu-ri as Kim Bo-mi (32 years old), a beautiful and intelligent, but self-centered news anchor.
 Uhm Ji-won as Lee Bom (42 years old), a former popular actress who is now a devoted wife and mother.
 Lee Jong-hyuk as Lee Hyung-suk (39 years old), Bo-mi's team leader at the broadcasting station.
 Choi Byung-mo as Park Yoon-cheol (45 years old), Bom's husband who is a member of the National Assembly.

Supporting

Angel's House
 Ahn Se-ha as Heo Bom-sam
 Kim Nam-hee as Heo Bom-il
 Oh Young-shil as Sister Angelina

MBS Broadcasting Station
 Jung Han-heon as Yoon Young-hoo
 Kim Jeong-pal as Director Kim
 Mi Ram as Reporter Chun Soo-hyun
 Kim Yoon-joo as Writer Yeon Min-jeong

Others
 Carson Allen as Anastasia 
 Kim Kwang-kyu as Representative Bang Kwang-gyu
 Son Eun-seo as Choi Seo-jin
 Lee Seo-yeon as Park Si-won, Bom's daughter.
 Yoo Jung-woo as Je Im-soo, a rising idol.
 Heo Tae-hee as Yoon Jin-woo
 Geum Chae-an as Kim Yu-ri

Production
The first script reading of the cast was held on November 16, 2018.

Original soundtrack

Part 1

Part 2

Part 3

Part 4

Part 5

Part 6

Ratings

Notes

References

External links
  
 
 

MBC TV television dramas
Korean-language television shows
2019 South Korean television series debuts
2019 South Korean television series endings
South Korean fantasy television series
South Korean comedy television series
Television series by JS Pictures